Jones Escarpment is a curving escarpment, extending for  in a southerly direction from the Riddell Nunataks and facing eastward, located  north-northwest of Mount Starlight in Mac. Robertson Land. It was mapped from Australian National Antarctic Research Expeditions surveys and air photos, 1955–65, and was named by the Antarctic Names Committee of Australia for W.K. Jones, a geophysicist at Wilkes Station in 1960.

References

Escarpments of Antarctica
Landforms of Mac. Robertson Land